Jesse Hernandez may refer to:

Jesse Hernandez, Mexican-American wrestler
Jesse Hernandez (artist), American graphic designer and tattoo artist
Jesse Hernandez (cheerleader), American NFL cheerleader